Joaquim Lobo (born 6 January 1995 in Maputo) is a Mozambican canoeist. He competed in the men's C-1 200 metres event and the men's C-2 1000 metres event at the 2016 Summer Olympics. He did not qualify for the semifinals in the men's C-1 200m event. Along with partner Mussa Chamaune, he finished in 11th place in the C-2 1000m event. Lobo was the flag bearer for Mozambique during the Parade of Nations. In June 2021, he qualified to represent Mozambique at the 2020 Summer Olympics.

References

External links
 

1995 births
Living people
Place of birth missing (living people)
Mozambican male canoeists
Olympic canoeists of Mozambique
Canoeists at the 2016 Summer Olympics
Canoeists at the 2020 Summer Olympics
African Games silver medalists for Mozambique
African Games bronze medalists for Mozambique
African Games medalists in canoeing
Competitors at the 2011 All-Africa Games
Competitors at the 2019 African Games